Trostianets is a city in Sumy Oblast, Ukraine.

Trostianets may also refer to other places in Ukraine:

Railway stations
Trostyanets-Smorodyne railway station, Southern Railways station

Urban settlements
Trostianets, Vinnytsia Oblast

Villages
Trostianets, Berezhany Raion, a village in Ternopil Oblast
Trostianets, Mykolaiv Raion, a village in Mykolaiv Raion, Lviv Oblast
Trostianets, Odessa Oblast, a village in Velyka Mykhailivka Raion
Trostianets, Zboriv Raion, a village in Zboriv Raion in Ternopil Oblast
Trostianets, Zolochiv Raion, a village in Zolochiv Raion, Lviv Oblast
Trostianets Velykyi, a village in Poltava Raion in Poltava Oblast